is a Japanese former track and field athlete and currently a professional keirin cyclist. She competed in the 4 × 100 meters relay at the 2005 World Athletics Championships.

Personal bests

International competition

References

External links

Yuka Sato at Mizuno Track Club  (archived)
Yuka Sato at Keirin.jp
Yuka Sato at Keirin Station
Yuka Sato at Girl's Keirin

1981 births
Living people
Japanese female sprinters
Japanese female long jumpers
Japanese female triple jumpers
Sportspeople from Aomori Prefecture
World Athletics Championships athletes for Japan
Japanese female cyclists
21st-century Japanese women